Peter Njenga was an Anglican bishop in Kenya; he was Bishop of Mount Kenya South from 1996 to 2004.

References

20th-century Anglican bishops of the Anglican Church of Kenya
21st-century Anglican bishops of the Anglican Church of Kenya
Anglican bishops of Mount Kenya South
Living people
Year of birth missing (living people)